In the context of the programming language C++, functional refers to a header file that is part of the C++ Standard Library and provides a set of predefined class templates for function objects, including operations for arithmetic, comparisons, and logic. Instances of these class templates are C++ classes that define a function call operator, and the instances of these classes can be called as if they were functions. It is possible to perform very sophisticated operations without writing a new function object, simply by combining predefined function objects and function object adaptors.

The class template std::function provided by C++11 is a general-purpose polymorphic function wrapper. Instances of std::function can store, copy, and invoke any callable target—functions, lambda expressions (expressions defining anonymous functions), bind expressions (instances of function adapters that transform functions to other functions of smaller arity by providing values for some of the arguments), or other function objects.

The algorithms provided by the C++ Standard Library do not require function objects of more than two arguments. Function objects that return Boolean values are an important special case.

Adaptable function objects
In general, a function object has restrictions on the type of its argument. The type restrictions need not be simple, though:  may be overloaded or may be a member template. Similarly, there need be no way for a program to determine what those restrictions are. An adaptable function object, however, does specify what the argument and return types are, and provides nested s so that those types can be named and used in programs. If a type  is a model of an adaptable generator, then it must define .

Adaptable function objects are important, because they can be used by function object adaptors: function objects that transform or manipulate other function objects.

Predefined function objects
The C++ Standard Library includes in the header file functional many different predefined function objects, including arithmetic operations (and ), comparisons (and ), and logical operations (and ).

Examples 

Function wrappers can be used to make calls to ordinary functions or to functions objects created by lambda expressions.

#include <iostream>
#include <functional>

/* Define a template function */
template <typename T>
void PrintValue(T value) {
  std::cout << value << std::endl;
}

int main(void) {
  /* A function wrapper to a function */
  std::function<void(int)> func_a = PrintValue<int>;
  func_a(2015);

  /* A function wrapper to a function pointer */
  std::function<void(int)> func_b = &PrintValue<int>;
  func_b(2016);

  /* A function wrapper to a lambda function. */
  std::function<void(int)> func_c = [](int value) {
    std::cout << value << std::endl;
  };
  func_c(2017);

  /* A function wrapper generated by std::bind().
   * Pass a pre-defined parameter when binding.
   */
  std::function<void(void)> func_d = std::bind(PrintValue<std::string>, "PI is");
  func_d();

  /* A function wrapper generated by std::bind().
   * Pass a parameter when calling the function.
   */
  std::function<void(float)> func_e =
      std::bind(PrintValue<float>, std::placeholders::_1);
  func_e(3.14159);
}

Function wrappers also can be used to access member variables and member functions of classes.

#include <iostream>
#include <functional>

template <typename T>
class CAnyData {
 public:
  CAnyData(T value) : m_value{value} {}
  void Print(void) { std::cout << m_value << std::endl; }
  void PrintAfterAdd(T value) { std::cout << (m_value + value) << std::endl; }

  T m_value;
};

int main() {
  /* A function wrapper to a member variable of a class */
  CAnyData<int> data_a{2016};
  std::function<int(CAnyData<int> &)> func_a = &CAnyData<int>::m_value;
  std::cout << func_a(data_a) << std::endl;

  /* A function wrapper to member function without parameter passing */
  CAnyData<float> data_b{2016.1};
  std::function<void(CAnyData<float> &)> func_b = &CAnyData<float>::Print;
  func_b(data_b);

  /* A function wrapper to member function with passing a parameter */
  std::function<void(CAnyData<float> &, float)> func_c =
      &CAnyData<float>::PrintAfterAdd;
  func_c(data_b, 0.1);

  /* A function wrapper to member function generated by std::bind */
  std::function<void(float)> func_d = std::bind(&CAnyData<float>::PrintAfterAdd,
                                                &data_b, std::placeholders::_1);
  func_d(0.2);
}

References

External links
 C++ reference for standard function objects

C++
C++ Standard Library
Articles with example C++ code